Shaobing, also called huoshao, is a type of baked, unleavened, layered flatbread in northern Chinese cuisine. Shaobing can be made with or without stuffing, and with or without sesame on top. Shaobing contains a variety of stuffings that can be grouped into two main flavors: savory or sweet. Some common stuffings include red bean paste, black sesame paste, stir-fried mung beans with egg and tofu, braised beef, smoked meat, or beef or pork with spices.

Shaobing is not very well known in southern China, unlike other northern dishes like mantou, baozi, and youtiao. Most Shaobing are popular in the northern part of China. Different types of shaobing are often associated with certain cities and towns.

Shaobing is a common breakfast item. Filled shaobing are usually eaten with soy milk and tea, while unfilled ones are usually eaten with steamed eggs or a breakfast meat dish. In the Mandarin cuisine tradition, shaobing are served with hot pot (huǒguō) in winter or soy milk.

History

"barbarian pastry"). Shaobing is believed to be related to the Persian and Central Asian naan and the Near Eastern pita. Foreign westerners made and sold sesame cakes in China during the Tang dynasty.

Categories

Huangqiao Shaobing

Huangqiao Shaobing (Huangqiao Sesame Cake; simplified Chinese: 黄桥烧饼; pinyin: Huángqiáo Shāobǐng) is one kind of Shaobing. It is made of flour, oil, sesame and other raw materials. It is golden in color and crispy on the outside. Traditionally, it is divided into sweet taste and salty taste. Generally, the sweet taste one is round and the salty taste one is long and oval.

Zhoucun Shaobing
Zhoucun Shaobing (simplified Chinese: 周村烧饼;), is a kind of Shaobing. It is a traditional snack in Zibo, Shandong province, China, created by Guo Yunlong based on a horseshoe-shaped thick pancake. Its shape is round and thin as paper. The front is covered with sesame seed, the back is full of crisp holes. It is famous because of its special crisp and ability to conserve for a long time

Magao
Magao (Changzhou Sesame Cake; simplified Chinese: 麻糕; pinyin: Chángzhōu Dàmágāo), one kind of Shaobing, is popular at a specific city—Changzhou in Jiangsu province. Changzhou Sesame cake is round and oval. The traditional flavors are sweet, salty and spicy. It has golden thin crisp skin. To make Changzhou Sesame cake, the chef needs to select finest pigs suet, white flour, hulled sesame seeds, white sugar, refined salt, etc. other refined raw materials; then use the traditional barrel furnace to bake.

See also 
 List of Chinese dishes
 Shaobing Song
 Pogača

References

Chinese breads
Flatbreads
Street food in China
Stuffed dishes
Baked foods
Breakfast dishes